Rufina Amaya (1943 – March 6, 2007) was the sole survivor of the El Mozote massacre on December 11 and December 12, 1981, in the Salvadoran department of Morazán during the Salvadoran Civil War.  Her testimony of the attacks, reported shortly afterward by two American reporters but called into question by the U.S. journalism community as well as by the U.S. and Salvadoran governments, was instrumental in the eventual investigation by the United Nations Commission on the Truth for El Salvador after the end of the war. The investigation led to the November 1992 exhumation of bodies buried at the site and the commission's conclusion that Amaya's testimony had accurately represented the events.

Hidden in a tree to which she had run while soldiers were distracted, Amaya watched and listened as government soldiers raped women, then killed men, women, and children by machine-gunning them, then burning their bodies. While hiding, she prayed to God that if he let her live, she would tell the world what took place there. She kept her promise.  Amaya lost not only her neighbors, but also her husband, Domingo Claros, whose decapitation she saw; her 9-year-old son, Cristino, who cried out to her, "Mama, they're killing me. They've killed my sister. They're going to kill me."; and her daughters María Dolores, María Lilian, and María Isabel, ages 5 years, 3 years, and 8 months old. The only one of her children with Claros who was not killed in the massacre was their daughter Fidelia, who was not in the village at the time.

Following the massacre, Amaya became a refugee for a time in the neighboring country of Honduras, where in 1985 she married fellow refugee José Natividad, with whom she had four children, divorcing within two years after the marriage. She returned to El Salvador in 1990 and became a lay minister for the Roman Catholic Church. By March 2000, Amaya was living near the Morazán village of Segundo Montes, Morazán, established by fellow repatriated exiles in memory of a Jesuit priest and scholar killed during the war in a mass assassination of priests by government forces at the Universidad Centroamericana "José Simeón Cañas" (UCA).

Amaya died of a stroke in a San Salvador hospital at the age of 64, on March 6, 2007, following a long illness. She was survived by her daughter Fidelia; her daughter Marta, from her second marriage; and by an adopted son, Walter Amaya.

Notes

References

External links
 The El Mozote Massacre (various articles)
 Testimony of Rufina Amaya: Sole survivor of the massacre (in Spanish)
 Alma Guillermoprieto. "Shedding light on humanity's dark side: the outspoken survivor of slaughter" (obituary of Amaya by one of the two original El Mozote reporters), The Washington Post, March 14, 2007, Page C01. Retrieved 2008-05-04.
 Scott Simon. New York Times reporter Raymond Bonner remembers Rufina Amaya, National Public Radio, March 17, 2007.
 Photo gallery of Rufina Amaya, Walls of Hope School of Art and Open Studio, Perquín, El Salvador. Retrieved 2008-05-06.

Human rights abuses in El Salvador
Massacres in El Salvador
People of the Salvadoran Civil War
1943 births
2007 deaths
People from Morazán Department
Salvadoran women
Women in warfare post-1945
Women in war in Central America
Refugees
Sole survivors